Zlatko Nastevski (Macedonian: Златкo Hacтeвcки; born 4 August 1957) is a retired Macedonian footballer who played as an attacking midfielder.

In October 2009, he played in the Australian "Olderoos" squad in the World Masters Games. Nastevski currently devotes his time to training Australia's future football talent through his academy NDFD.

Honours
With Marconi Fairfield
 NSL Championship: 1988, 1989

Personal honours:
NSL Player of the Year: 1989 with Marconi Fairfield
NSL Top Scorer: 1989 with Marconi Fairfield - 20 goals

External links
 Zlatko's football development program (NDFD) website
 Career Statistics at OzFootball
 NSL Player of the Year awards

1957 births
Living people
Footballers from Skopje
Association football midfielders
Yugoslav footballers
Macedonian footballers
Australian soccer players
FK Vardar players
FK Rabotnički players
FK Pelister players
Marconi Stallions FC players
Sydney Olympic FC players
Kedah Darul Aman F.C. players
Yugoslav First League players
Yugoslav Second League players
National Soccer League (Australia) players
Expatriate footballers in Malaysia
Macedonian expatriate sportspeople in Malaysia
Macedonian football managers
Marconi Stallions FC managers
Australian Macedonian soccer managers
Wollongong United FC players